Holy Trinity Church is a small Russian Orthodox church on King George Island near Bellingshausen Station, a Russian research station in Antarctica. It is one of the eight churches on Antarctica. It is the southernmost Eastern Orthodox church in the world (cf. St. Ivan Rilski Chapel).

The ambitious project to establish a permanent church or monastery on Antarctica first materialized during the 1990s. A charity named "Temple for Antarctica" (Храм — Антарктиде) was approved by Patriarch Alexius II and received donations from across Russia. They organized a competition for the project that was won by architects from Barnaul P.I. Anisifirov, S.G. Rybak and A.B. Schmidt.

The church is a 15m-high wooden structure built in traditional Russian style. It can accommodate up to 30 worshippers. The structure was built out of Siberian Pine by Altay carpenters led by K.V. Khromov, then dismantled, taken by truck to Kaliningrad and shipped to King George Island by the Russian supply ship Academician Vavilov. It was assembled on high ground near the seashore by the staff of Bellingshausen Station, under the general supervision of the 30-year-old Father Kallistrat (Romanenko), who was to become the church's first priest. Kallistrat, a hieromonk of Troitse-Sergiyeva Lavra, had previously served at the Lavra's skete on Anzer Island in the subarctic Solovki Archipelago.

The iconostasis of the church was created by Palekh painters. The church bells were commissioned by the descendants of Sergey Muravyov-Apostol.

The church was consecrated on February 15, 2004, by Theognost (Феогност), the Bishop of Sergiyev Posad and the Namestnik (abbot) of  Troitse-Sergiyeva Lavra, who visited Antarctica for this occasion, along with a number of other clerics, pilgrims, and sponsors.

The church is staffed year-round by one or two Orthodox priests, who are hieromonks of Troitse-Sergiyeva Lavra volunteering for the Antarctic assignment. Similarly to the personnel of most year-round Antarctic stations, the priests are rotated annually by the Lavra; however, several of them, including Father Kallistrat, chose to come back to King George Island for another one-year tour of duty after a year or two on the mainland.

Among the priests' tasks is praying for the souls of the 64 Russian people who have died in Antarctic expeditions and serving the spiritual needs of the staff of Bellingshausen Station and other nearby stations. Besides Russian polar researchers, the church is often visited by their colleagues from the nearby Chilean, Polish, Korean, and other research stations, as well as by tourists. For the benefit of Latin American visitors, some church services are conducted in Spanish.

On occasion, the priest baptizes new adherents of Christianity in the Southern Ocean. On 29 January 2007, the priest of the church celebrated the first church wedding in Antarctica. The husband, Eduardo Aliaga Ilabaca, is a staff member of a Chilean Antarctic base, who had joined the Orthodox Church soon after the opening of the Antarctic temple; his wife, Angelina Zhuldybina, is Russian.

In 2016 Patriarch Kirill visited the church. 

Priests also assist with the general maintenance of the Bellingshausen station.

See also
Chapel of the Snows, Antarctica
Religion in Antarctica
St. Ivan Rilski Chapel

Notes and references

External links

 Photos of Trinity Church
 History of the church 
 
Itar TASS press release 
 Photos 

Churches completed in 2004
2004 establishments in Antarctica
Churches in Antarctica
Outposts of Antarctica
Russia and the Antarctic
Polar exploration by Russia and the Soviet Union
Christian organizations established in 2004
Outposts of the South Shetland Islands
21st-century Eastern Orthodox church buildings